"Sand in My Shoes" is the fourth and final single release from English singer-songwriter Dido's second album, Life for Rent (2003). The lyrics describe a single woman returning from a holiday, reminiscing about a romantic encounter she had while away. Released on 23 August 2004, the single under-performed in the United Kingdom, reaching number 29 on the UK Singles Chart, but peaked at number one on the US Billboard Dance Club Play chart. A music video directed by Alex De Rakoff was made for the song.

Background
In a 2019 interview with PrideSource, when asked what the most unusual place that has given her inspiration for a song was, Dido mentioned "Sand in My Shoes". Dido ran onto a plane for a flight to Los Angeles after having been on the beach and literally had sand in her shoes. Dido said it gave her the idea to begin writing the song. Her father had fallen ill prior to the flight and Dido began writing on the plane as she said it is all she knows how to get through. Dido wrote the whole song on the plane.

Music video
The music video for "Sand in My Shoes" represents the song's plot, with surreal and symbolic images of a beach city and the partners in a house, playing dominos sitting in the street and at a party, mixed with images of Dido alone and a truck unloading sand in the street. It was directed by Alex De Rakoff and Dido's love interest was portrayed by Erik Fellows.

Track listings

UK CD single
 "Sand in My Shoes" (album version)
 "Sand in My Shoes" (Dab Hands Baleria Injection Mix)
 "Sand in My Shoes" (Beginerz Vocal Mix)
 "Sand in My Shoes" (Steve Lawler We Love Ibiza Mix)
 "Sand in My Shoes" (Rollo & Mark Bates Mix)

UK 12-inch vinyl
 "Sand in My Shoes" (Above & Beyond's UV Mix) – 9:48
 "Sand in My Shoes" (Filterheadz Mix) – 8:15

European CD single
 "Sand in My Shoes" (album version) – 4:59
 "Sand in My Shoes" (Dab Hands Baleria Injection Mix) – 6:18
 "Sand in My Shoes" (Beginerz Vocal Mix) – 8:07
 "Sand in My Shoes" (Rollo & Mark Bates Mix) – 8:07

US promotional 2×12-inch vinyl
A. "Sand in My Shoes" (Hani Num Sound Mix) – 9:37
B. "Sand in My Shoes" (Above & Beyond Mix) – 9:01
C. "Sand in My Shoes" (Rollo & Mark Bates Mix) – 8:07
D. "Don't Leave Home" (G&D Remix) – 9:46

US promotional 3×12-inch vinyl
A. "Sand in My Shoes" (Hani Num Sound Mix) – 9:37
B. "Sand in My Shoes" (Above & Beyond Mix) – 9:01
C. "Sand in My Shoes" (Filterheadz Mix) – 8:15
D. "Sand in My Shoes" (Steve Lawler We Love Ibiza Mix) – 11:25
E. "Sand in My Shoes" (Rollo & Mark Bates Mix) – 8:07
F. "Don't Leave Home" (G&D Remix) – 9:46

Credits and personnel
Credits are lifted from the UK CD single liner notes and the Life for Rent booklet.

Studios
 Recorded at The Ark  (Lincolnshire, England), The Church, Wessex Studios (London, England), and Cubejam (Miami, Florida, US)
 Mixed at The Church (London, England)
 Mastered at Metropolis Studios (London, England)

Personnel

 Dido – writing (as Dido Armstrong), production, bass programming
 Rick Nowels – writing, Rhodes piano, keyboards, acoustic guitar
 Rusty Anderson – electric guitar
 Mark Bates – additional keyboards, programming
 Sister Bliss – additional keyboards, programming, bass programming
 Andy Treacy – live drums
 Sudha – percussion
 Rollo – production
 Phill Brown – recording
 Ash Howes – mixing, recording
 Miles Showell – mastering

Charts

Weekly charts

Year-end charts

Release history

See also
 List of number-one dance singles of 2004 (U.S.)

References

2003 songs
2004 singles
Arista Records singles
Cheeky Records singles
Dido (singer) songs
Song recordings produced by Dido (singer)
Song recordings produced by Rollo Armstrong
Songs written by Dido (singer)
Songs written by Rick Nowels